Britoil plc was originally a privatised British oil company operating in the North Sea. It was once a constituent of the FTSE 100 Index. The company was acquired by BP in 1988, becoming a brand of it.

History 
The company was originally formed in 1975 as the British National Oil Corporation (BNOC), a nationalised body, under the provisions of the Petroleum & Submarine Pipe-lines Act 1975. Its objective was to maintain adequate oil supply levels.

Britoil's interest in UK oil and gas fields in 1982 was as follows.

As a result of the Oil and Gas (Enterprise) Act 1982, BNOC was split to enable the trading sector of the company BNOC to remain nationalised whilst the oil exploration and production sector, Britoil, was a limited liability company.

In November 1982, 51% of Governmental shares in Britoil were sold off, however was substantially under-subscribed. The resultant losses were carried by underwriters. The remaining Government minority shareholding in Britoil was sold in November 1985 for £434 million, ensuring it kept a ‘Golden Share’ in order to veto any outsourcing attempts. The collapse in world oil prices globally, combined with the possession of Britoil’s majority share by BP meant that the golden share was sold to British Petroleum  in 1988.

Britoil’s Production entitlement and financial summary was as follows:

In the same year, the company had been subject of an attempted £23 million fraud by one of its own cashiers.

Key people 
Chairman and Chief Executive: Baron Kearton (Christopher Frank Kearton) (1975–79), Ronald Utiger (1979–1980), Sir Philip Shelbourne (July 1980 – 1988), Sir Robin Duthie (1988–90).

After the splitting off of Britoil Lord Croham, the deputy chairman of BNOC, became chairman of BNOC’s trading activities (1982–85).

See also
List of oil exploration and production companies

References

External links
 Worksmart info on Britoil plc
 Catalogue of Clive Jenkins' papers re Britoil, held at the Modern Records Centre, University of Warwick

Oil and gas companies of the United Kingdom
Former BP subsidiaries
Companies based in Aberdeen
Companies formerly listed on the London Stock Exchange
1975 establishments in Scotland
Non-renewable resource companies established in 1975
United Kingdom
Non-renewable resource companies disestablished in 1988
1988 disestablishments in Scotland
Energy companies established in 1975
British companies disestablished in 1988
British companies established in 1975